Matthew McDowell was a steamboat owner and builder associated with the Puget Sound Mosquito Fleet.

Background
McDowell was born in Glasgow, Scotland, and left home at age 15 to work as a coal passer for steamers of the Anchor Line. He had three sons and one daughter, all of whom were associated with his steamboat business. His three sons Albert(George Alexander), Robert, and John served as engineers and eventually all qualified as masters. His daughter Mary acted as purser. Mary later married Arthur Thompson, who became a well-known Puget Sound pilot.

McDowell's fleet was originally based in Tacoma near the smelter. He often slept on one of his boats, especially if he was to be its captain the following morning. Once a vessel he was sleeping in was nearly run down by a large steamer, so in 1905 Captain McDowell bought  of land on Browns Point.

House and dock near Browns Point Lighthouse 
McDowell built a house and dock near the lighthouse. He called his new home Caledonia, after the poetic name for Scotland. His boats served landings Dumas Bay, Lakota, Adelaide, Redondo, Des Moines, Zenith, Maury, Portage, Chautauqua, Vashon Island, Tacoma and Seattle. As the permanent population and the summer vacationers increased, his business thrived. He later built a dance hall next to his dock, and transported patrons to it on the D fleet steamers.

Operation of Quickstep
In early 1890s, McDowell operated the propeller steamer Quickstep (built at Astoria in 1877) as a towboat on Puget Sound.

First boat
In 1897, McDowell built his first boat. Defiance (I), at Caledonia, near Tacoma.  She was 60.5 long and rated at 85 tons.  Defiance (I) was the first of six steamboats launched by Captain McDowell, all beginning with the letter "D" and all built at the Crawford and Reid ship yard.  In each case, Captain McDowell took personal charge of the construction.

The D Fleet
Boats built or reconstructed by Captain McDowell for his "D Fleet" included
Defiance (I)
Dove ex-Typhoon, built 1889, and later reconstructed following acquisition by Capt. McDowell;
Dauntless, built 1899,
Defiance (II), built 1901
Daring, later Clinton, built 1909
Dart, built 1911
Daily later Island Princess and ferry Cy Peck, built 1912

The D Fleet also is reported to have operated Monticello (built 1906).

Later years
Ready sources do not give much information on the later days of Captain McDowell.  The webpage of a local historical society states that Captain McDowell anticipated a decline in passenger business as the demand grew for automobile ferries, and began selling his fleet in 1918 while steamers were still in demand, retiring completely from the steamer service in August 1919.  It is known that he lived to at least the age of 94 years.  He died in Tacoma in December, 1944.

Notes 

Defunct shipping companies based in Washington (state)